Bielany , originally a village near Kraków (Poland), since 1941 one of its neighbourhoods, located some  west of the city centre. Nowadays Bielany is a part of Kraków's Zwierzyniec District.

History

The first written record of Bielany comes from the 12th century. In the first half of the 17th century a Camaldolese monastery was established there, damaged in 1655 during the Siege of Kraków (1655) in the course of the Polish-Swedish war. It was rebuilt after a subsequent fire in 1814.

Under the Austrian Partition, after 30 years of deliberation and planning, in 1901 Kraków's first municipal water supply plant opened in Bielany. Additional capacity was provided in 1917, and the plant is still in use today in a limited capacity.

The nature reserve called Little Bielany Rocks on the southern slope of the monastery hill was established in 1957.

References

Links
 Dariusz Orman,  KRAKÓW-BIELANY Informator turystyczny
 Wydawnictwo Pascal,  Bielany, Kraków

Camaldolese monasteries
Districts of Kraków
Benedictine monasteries in Poland